Henan-Menon Memorial Airport, also known as Norfolk Airport was an airfield operational in the mid-20th century in Norfolk, Massachusetts.

References

Defunct airports in Massachusetts
Norfolk, Massachusetts
Airports in Norfolk County, Massachusetts